The 1999 Four Continents Figure Skating Championships was an international figure skating competition in the 1998–99 season. It was held at the Halifax Metro Centre in Halifax, Canada on February 21–28. Medals were awarded in the disciplines of men's singles, ladies' singles, pair skating, and ice dancing. This was the first Four Continents Figure Skating Championships to be held.

Medals table

Results

Men

Ladies

Pairs

Ice dancing

External links
 1999 Four Continents Figure Skating Championships
 Chinese pair win at Four Continents
 Kwan's absence, Stojko headline Four Continents
 Canadian champs lead Four Continents championship
 Malinina takes women's crown

Four Continents Figure Skating Championships
Four Continents Figure Skating Championships
Four Continents